Martin J. Davies (born 30 September 1957) is a UK-born professor of maritime law and heads the Maritime Law  Center at Tulane University Faculty of Law, New Orleans, where he is the Admiralty Law Institute Professor of Maritime Law.  He is a graduate of Oxford University (B.A. in Jurisprudence, 1978; B.C.L. 1979; M.A. 1983) and Harvard University (LL.M., 1980), and serves on the editorial board of Lloyd's Maritime and  Commercial Law Quarterly. He became a Titulary Member of the Comite Maritime International (CMI) in 2019.  In 2021, he was accepted for the award of the degree of Doctor of Civil Law (D.C.L.) at the University of Oxford, a degree to be awarded in 2022.

References

External links

1957 births
Living people
Alumni of the University of Oxford
Harvard Law School alumni
Tulane University Law School faculty